Johannes Bernole (born 8 May 1998) is a New Caledonian international footballer who plays as a defender for New Caledonia Super Ligue side Hienghène Sport.

Career statistics

International

References

1998 births
Living people
New Caledonian footballers
New Caledonia international footballers
Association football defenders
Hienghène Sport players